Red granadilla is a common name for several plants and may refer to:

Passiflora capsularis
Passiflora coccinea, native to northern South America